Lilla Bodor (born 1979) is a Hungarian painter.

The artist presents the spaces of our lives  filtered by a real convex mirror and the curved mirror of her imagination as well. Two of the capital features of Lilla Bodor’s creating practice, the usage of tondo – the round picture formats, and the bending of the painted spaces, figures, objects.

About Lilla Bodor's paintings
The main topics of the paintings depicting the reflections are mostly inner spaces and female figures. She reflects the world in a convex mirror and she further interprets this view in the arrangement and painting of her pictures.

Education

2001–2007 Hungarian University of Fine Arts, Budapest
2006 Erasmus Scholarship at Edinburgh College of Art.

Social memberships 

National Association of Hungarian Creative Artists (member, 2007-).

Awards
2007 Béla Gruber Award.

Selected exhibitions

2002 Language of colours. Hungarian University of Fine Arts, Budapest;
2005 Undersized. Group exhibition. Várfok Gallery, Budapest;
2005 Solo exhibition. Lukács Confectionery, Budapest;
2006 Dance of Life. Solo exhibition. Bartók Theatre and House of Art, Dunaújváros;
2007 Best of Diploma 2007. Barcsay Hall Hungarian University of Fine Arts, Budapest;
2007 Fresh Europe 2007. Group exhibition. KOGART House, Budapest;
2008 Budapest Art Expo Fresh. International Biennial of Young Artists, ArtMill, Szentendre;
2008 Tradition of the City. NetAktív Gallery, Budapest;
2008 55. Autumn Exhibition at Vásárhely. János Tornyai Museum, Hódmezővásárhely;
2008 Propos d’Europe 7.0. Paris-Fehérvárcsurgó Károlyi castle, Fehérvárcsurgó;
2008 Szalmaszál Foundation Charity Auction. Centrális Gallery CEU, Budapest;
2009 Solo exhibition. Madách Theatre, Budapest;
2009 II Munkácsy Collective exhibition. Volksbank Gallery Istenhegyi street, Budapest;
2009 Mood for Tondo. Solo exhibition. Ráday Volksbank Gallery, Budapest;
2010 What iF? Solo Exhibition. IF Jazz Café, Budapest.

References

Living people
1979 births
Hungarian University of Fine Arts alumni
Alumni of the Edinburgh College of Art
21st-century Hungarian women artists